Sir Ronald Hugh Grierson (6 August 1921 – 23 October 2014) was a German-born British banker, businessman, government advisor, and British Army officer. After service in the Black Watch, attached to the Special Air Service and mentioned in despatches, during the Second World War, he became a lieutenant colonel in the post-war SAS. He was managing director of the investment bank S.G. Warburg from 1948 to 1985, and Vice-Chairman of General Electric Company plc, an industrial conglomerate, from 1968 to 1996. From 1972 to 1974, he was Director-General for Industry at the European Commission.

Early life
Grierson was born Rolf Hans Griessmann in Nuremberg, Germany, on 6 August 1921, the son of Ernest Griessmann. After early schooling in Nuremberg and Paris, he was educated at Highgate School from 1935 to 1939 and at Balliol College, Oxford.

References

1921 births
2014 deaths
English investment bankers
British business executives
Special Air Service officers
British Army personnel of World War II
German emigrants to England
People educated at Highgate School
Alumni of Balliol College, Oxford
People named in the Panama Papers
Naturalised citizens of the United Kingdom
Black Watch officers
20th-century English businesspeople
German emigrants to the United Kingdom